Olivia Stokes may refer to:
 Olivia P. Stokes, American religious educator, Baptist minister, author, administrator, and civil rights activist
 Olivia Egleston Phelps Stokes, American writer and benefactor
 Olivia Stokes Hatch, née Stokes, American philanthropist, clubwoman, and travel writer